Massimiliano Stampa (1494 – Milan, June 19, 1552) was an Italian nobleman and politician, 1st Marquess of Soncino.

Biography 
Massimiliano was born into one of the most influential noble families of Milan. His father was Count Pietro Martire Stampa and his mother Countess Barbara Crivelli Stampa.

Massimiliano was a loyal courtier of Francesco II Sforza and castellan of the Sforza Castle from 1531. The Duke held him in high regard, and in 1534 was appointed to accompany the future duchess Christina of Denmark on her first trip to Milan. He also hosted a reception for her in his Cusago Castle, which he bought that same year.

After the death of Francesco II in 1535 the city was about to plunge into chaos, just as it happened when Filippo Maria Visconti died. To avoid disorders, Massimiliano took charge of an embassy and offered Milan to Charles V, Emperor of the Holy Roman Empire. Later that year he was created 1st Marquess of Soncino in recognition.

The Stampa owned many other fiefs, such as Melzo and Gorgonzola, given to Massimiliano by Francesco II. In 1525 he also acquired the fief of Rivolta d'Adda and Castellazzo di Corbetta (later Castellazzo de' Stampi).

After his death in 1552, Massimiliano was buried in the Basilica of San Marco in Milan, and his titles passed to his younger brother, Ermes I, who became 2nd Marquess of Soncino.

Family Tree

Citations

See also 
 Stampa (family)
 Soncino
 Cusago

References

External links 
 

Italian nobility
Milan
House of Sforza
1494 births
1552 deaths